Group B of the 2007 Fed Cup Asia/Oceania Zone Group I was one of two pools in the Asia/Oceania Zone Group I of the 2007 Fed Cup. Five teams competed in a round robin competition, with the top team proceeding to their respective sections of the play-offs: the top team played for advancement to the World Group II Play-offs.

India vs. Kazakhstan

New Zealand vs. Jordan

India vs. Jordan

Chinese Taipei vs. Kazakhstan

India vs. New Zealand

Chinese Taipei vs. Jordan

Chinese Taipei vs. New Zealand

Kazakhstan vs. Jordan

India vs. Chinese Taipei

New Zealand vs. Kazakhstan

See also
Fed Cup structure

References

External links
 Fed Cup website

2007 Fed Cup Asia/Oceania Zone